Jesper Williamsson (born April 23, 1990) is a Swedish former professional ice hockey defenceman who played with HV71 and Rögle BK in the Swedish Hockey League (SHL).

Playing career
Williamsson made his Elitserien debut playing with HV71 during the 2008–09 Elitserien season. He left HV71 in 2015 and joined Rögle BK.

On August 2, 2017, Williamsson signed a one year extension with Rögle BK. Prior to the 2018–19 season, Williamsson was named an alternate captain alongside Taylor Matson and Ted Brithén.

On April 25, 2019, Williamsson returned to HV71 signing a one-year contract for the 2019–20 season. On 30 July 2021, Williamsson announced his retirement from professional hockey after 13 seasons due to a chronic back injury.

Personal life
His brother Jens also plays hockey.

References

External links

1990 births
Living people
HV71 players
Malmö Redhawks players
IK Oskarshamn players
Rögle BK players
Swedish ice hockey defencemen
IF Troja/Ljungby players